Curricabark River, a perennial river of the Manning River catchment, is located in the Northern Tablelands region of New South Wales, Australia.

Course and features
Curricabark River rises on the eastern slopes of the Great Dividing Range, northwest of Cootera Hill, southeast of Nundle and flows generally southeast, before reaching its confluence with the Barnard River, northwest of Giro, north of Gloucester. The river descends  over its  course.

See also 

 Rivers of New South Wales
 List of rivers of New South Wales (A–K)
 List of rivers of Australia

References

Rivers of New South Wales
Northern Tablelands
Mid-Coast Council